The Chronicles of Narnia: Prince Caspian is an action-adventure video game developed by Traveller's Tales to coincide with the theatrical release of the film of the same name. It was released for the Nintendo DS, Xbox 360, PlayStation 2, Wii, Microsoft Windows and PlayStation 3 on 15 May 2008 in North America to mixed reception. The DS version was also the first game to implement Disney's DGamer online chat service. As of 2023, it is the last Traveller's Tales game to be developed outside of LEGO video games.

A significant feature has William Moseley, Skandar Keynes, Anna Popplewell, Georgie Henley, Ben Barnes, Vincent Grass, Peter Dinklage, and Cornell S. John reprising their roles from the film.

Plot 

One year has passed in the real world since the first adventure ended, but in Narnia, almost 1300 years have passed. The villainous King Miraz prevents the rightful heir, his young nephew, Prince Caspian, from ruling the land of Narnia. Caspian uses Susan's magic horn that was left in Narnia to summon the four Pevensies and a small army of Old Narnians to help him reclaim his rightful throne, and find Aslan.

Puzzles need to be solved to progress through the game and unlock bonus material. Featuring 20 playable characters, of which 4 are available in each level, each character uses different weapons and abilities. These Include: The Pevensie children, Prince Caspian, Glenstorm, Trumpkin, Dr. Cornelius, Reepicheep, Giant Wimbleweather, Tyrus the Satyr, and Asterius the Minotaur. In addition to these, several unnamed characters are also playable, including Trees, Fauns, Centaurs, Gryphons and horses. They can also be controlled after they have been mounted by the player's character. Bonus material is, however, primarily unlocked by opening Treasure Chests, which require a certain number of keys to be opened.

Development 
Walt Disney Pictures recorded one exclusive scene for the game that does not appear in the motion picture. The bonus scene depicts Cornelius telling Caspian about the Pevensies, the Narnians and the war.

Reception 

The game was met with average to mixed reviews upon release.  GameRankings and Metacritic gave it a score of 52.22% and 54 out of 100 for the DS version; 60% and 53 out of 100 for the PC version; 75% and 67 out of 100 for the PlayStation 2 version; 59.12% and 56 out of 100 for the PlayStation 3 version; 61.78% and 56 out of 100 for the Xbox 360 version; and 68.75% and 63 out of 100 for the Wii version.

References

External links 
 Official site
 
 
 

2008 video games
Action-adventure games
Cooperative video games
Disney video games
Nintendo DS games
PlayStation 2 games
PlayStation 3 games
PlayStation Network games
Prince Caspian
Video games based on adaptations
Traveller's Tales games
Video games based on films
Video games scored by David Whittaker
Video games scored by Mark Griskey
Video games developed in the United Kingdom
Wii games
Windows games
Xbox 360 games
The Chronicles of Narnia (film series)
Multiplayer and single-player video games